Minuscule 72 (in the Gregory-Aland numbering), ε 110 (von Soden), is a Greek minuscule manuscript of the New Testament, on parchment leaves. Palaeographically it has been assigned to the 11th century. John Mill called it Codex Ephesinus. The manuscript has complex contents with full marginalia.

It is currently housed at the British Library (Harley MS 5647).

Description 

The codex contains complete text of the four Gospels on 268 leaves (size ). The text is written in one column per page, 22-24 lines per page in an elegant minuscule letters. The capital letters in red.

There is also another division according to the smaller Ammonian Sections (Matthew 360, Mark 240 – 16:19; Luke 342, John 232), with references to the Eusebian Canons.

It is elegantly written. It has scholia in Matthew and two scholia in Mark (16:19.20).

It has various readings and personal notes in the margin of the codex written in Greek and Arabic. The text of Matthew is surrounded by a catena (largely derived from the homilies of John Chrysostom).

Text 

The Greek text of the codex is a representative of the Byzantine text-type. Aland did not place it in any Category. According to Hermann von Soden it is related to the Family Π. It was confirmed by Kirsopp Lake. According to the Claremont Profile Method it represents family Πa in Luke 1 and family Kx in Luke 10 and Luke 20.

It does not contain the Pericope Adulterae (John 7:53-8:11).

History 

The manuscript is dated by the INTF to the 11th century. It was written in Syria or Palestina.

According to Arabic notes on a margin, the manuscript was later in the property of a Presbyter David, the son of Micheal the Metropolitan of Bosra. C. R. Gregory saw it in 1883.

It was examined by Wettstein in 1731 and Griesbach.

See also 

 List of New Testament minuscules
 Biblical manuscript
 Textual criticism

References

Further reading 

 A Catalogue of the Harleian Manuscripts in the British Museum, 4 vols (London: Eyre and Strahan, 1808–12), II (1808), no. 5647.
 J. W. Burgon, The Last Twelve Verses of the Gospel According to St. Mark (Oxford and London, 1871). 
 Kirsopp Lake, "Family Π and the Codex Alexandrinus. The Text According to Mark" (London 1936).

External links 

 Harley 5647 at the British Library

Greek New Testament minuscules
11th-century biblical manuscripts
Harleian Collection